HMS E32 was a British E class submarine built by J. Samuel White, Cowes, Isle of Wight. She was launched on 16 August 1916 and commissioned in October 1916. HMS E32 was sold in Sunderland on 6 September 1922.

Design
She was powered by two  Vickers eight-cylinder two-stroke diesel engines and two  electric motors.

E32 was armed with a 12-pounder  QF gun mounted forward of the conning tower. She had five 18 inch (450 mm) torpedo tubes, two in the bow, one either side amidships, and one in the stern; a total of 10 torpedoes were carried.

E-Class submarines had wireless systems with  power ratings; in some submarines, these were later upgraded to  systems by removing a midship torpedo tube. Their maximum design depth was  although in service some reached depths of below . Some submarines contained Fessenden oscillator systems.

Crew
Her complement was three officers and 28 men.

Service
E32 was built by J. Samuel White at their Cowes, Isle of Wight shipyard. She was launched on 16 August 1916 and completed in October 1916.

In November 1916, E32 was listed as a member of the Ninth Submarine Flotilla, part of the Harwich Force. In February 1917, E32 was one of for submarines that deployed with the depot ship  for anti-U-boat patrols off Eagle Island. Patrols in the Irish Sea continued, with E32 spotting a German submarine on 8 March, but the German submarine escaped on the surface, outpacing E32. On 5 April 1917, E32 was operating with the decoy ship Q.13 (the sloop ), when the merchant ship Benheather was torpedoed by the German submarine , but did not immediately sink. E32 waited by the still floating wreck of Benheather for U-46 to approach, and when the German submarine closed, fired three torpedoes, which missed.

References

Bibliography
 
 

 

British E-class submarines of the Royal Navy
Ships built on the Isle of Wight
1916 ships
World War I submarines of the United Kingdom
Royal Navy ship names